Athous curtulus is a species of click beetle from the family Elateridae endemic to Spain.

References

Beetles described in 1873
Endemic fauna of Spain
Dendrometrinae